The 1965 Brisbane Rugby League season was the 57th season of the Brisbane Rugby League premiership. Eight teams from across Brisbane competed for the premiership, which culminated in Redcliffe defeating Fortitude Valley 15–2 to claim their first premiership in club history.

Ladder

Finals 

Source:

References 

1965 in rugby league
1965 in Australian rugby league
Rugby league in Brisbane